LNER Peppercorn Class A2 No. 60532 Blue Peter is the sole survivor of 15 4-6-2   locomotives of the A2 class, designed by Arthur Peppercorn of the LNER. 60532 worked between 1948 and 1966. It is owned by the Royal Scot Locomotive and General Trust (RSL&GT), currently under overhaul at their LNWR Heritage facility based at Crewe.

Construction
60532 was built at Doncaster Works and out-shopped by the newly formed British Railways on 25 March 1948. The initial livery was LNER apple green with British Railways on the tender sides.

60532 was named in the LNER tradition of using the names of famous racehorses. Blue Peter III was the name of a horse owned by  Harry Primrose, 6th Earl of Rosebery, which in 1939 won races including The Derby and the 2000 Guineas. The horse earned almost £32,000 for Lord Rosebery, more than enough to purchase three Doncaster Pacific locomotives at the time.

BR service
Initially all the A2s were allocated to English sheds. 60532 was allocated to the North Eastern Region of BR at York, where it worked principally over the East Coast Main Line.

In the autumn of 1949, five A2s were overhauled at Doncaster, where a number of modifications were made, including the fitting of a multiple valve regulator and a double blastpipe and chimney, together with Kylchap cowls. In addition, 60532 received a second whistle placed offside behind the chimney.  This chime whistle is being sounded in the illustration above. Subsequently, the five A2s, including 60532, moved to Scotland to make up for deficiencies experienced with the Thompson Class A2/2s (rebuilt LNER Class P2). 60532 was allocated to Aberdeen, with all the Scottish-based A2s used mainly on express passenger services between Aberdeen and Edinburgh, which benefited from their greater power and acceleration.

After the English-based A2s were withdrawn in 1962 and 1963, the three remaining Scottish A2s remained in service until 1966. Replaced by diesel power, 60532 was allocated to Dundee and became the last Peppercorn Pacific to be overhauled at Darlington Works. As a result, it was often requested for rail tours, working as far as Holyhead and Exeter St Davids.

60532's final rail tour was in October 1966 over the Waverley Line and the West Coast Main Line over Beattock. 60532 was withdrawn from service on 31 December 1966, and put into storage.

Preservation
Geoff Drury had purchased LNER Class A4 4464 Bittern from British Rail in 1966. In 1968, he tried to buy an A1, but after the last one was cut up he was offered and purchased 60532 in 1968.

After preservation, 60532 was the subject of a campaign for its restoration on the BBC Television series Blue Peter, and the locomotive has subsequently been featured several times in the programme. Restoration was undertaken at York, Leeds and Doncaster Works where it was repainted in LNER apple green livery as No 532. 60,000 people witnessed its renaming by the BBC Blue Peter programme presenters at a Doncaster Works Open Day in 1971.

Moved to the Dinting Railway Centre, it did little running and in late 1987, the North Eastern Locomotive Preservation Group (NELPG) took charge of 60532 and A4 Bittern on long-term loan from the Drury family. Restored at the Imperial Chemical Industries works at Wilton, Redcar and Cleveland, 60532 was renamed by the BBC Blue Peter programme for a second time in December 1991.

It was then moved to the North Yorkshire Moors Railway for running in. The locomotive obtained its main line certificate in 1992 and subsequently worked many rail tours over the Settle and Carlisle Railway and as far north as its old depot of Aberdeen.

1994 accident
On 1 October 1994, during a run from Edinburgh to York, 60532 suffered extensive damage during a catastrophic uncontrolled wheelslip after leaving Durham station. The damaged parts included the outside valve motion, coupling rods and axleboxes; a driving wheel also moved on its axle.

1994–2014

The damage to the motion, cylinders and driving wheels was devastating. The locomotive was moved to Thornaby MPD, where the repair work took 18 months to complete. 60532 was then moved again to the NYMR for running in. The locomotive resumed its mainline career in November 1996, working a charter from Middlesbrough to Preston via Newcastle and Carlisle.

In 1998, 60532 ran an Edinburgh to London excursion to mark the 40th anniversary of the Blue Peter TV programme. The trip was Day's Out Limited's "Heart of Midlothian" which had run from Kings Cross to Edinburgh behind a diesel and 60532 worked the journey south with members of the Blue Peter team traveling on board. One presenter Stuart Miles even travelled on the footplate between Newark and Peterborough as that was the section that Mallard set the speed record in 1938.

60532's mainline certificate expired in September 2001 and after that, she was then based at the NYMR, where it worked until the end of the 2002 season when her boiler certificate expired. It was subsequently displayed at the Darlington Railway Centre and Museum. On 22 May 2007, BBC Look North News reported that the locomotive was being moved into storage in Chesterfield, due to the renovation of the museum, and would not be returning.

After 60532 was moved to the Barrow Hill Engine Shed in Derbyshire, the NELPG hoped to raise £600,000 for restoration of the locomotive to main line running. There she was repainted to British Railways apple green livery, similar to the first livery used on the A1 Class 60163 Tornado.

RSL&GT: 2014–present
In October 2014, the engine was sold by the Drury family to Jeremy Hosking under the ownership of the RSL&GT, who plan to restore it to main line standard with a return originally scheduled for 2016. The locomotive was moved to the LNWR Heritage facility at Crewe in May 2015 and is currently under overhaul. On 10 August 2017, it made another appearance on the Blue Peter TV programme (as well as showing footage of when it was moved by road from Barrow Hill to Crewe with the help of Radzi Chinyanganya and Barney Harwood), Lindsey Russell helps out in the workshop with its overhaul which included helping with the construction of its new firebox.

References

External links 
 60532 Blue Peter official site at the NELPG
 Video footage of the 1994 slip
 Blue Peter on the ECML in 1998
 Blue Peter 40th Anniversary Railtour Part 1
 Blue Peter 40th Anniversary Railtour Part 2

LNER A2 Peppercorn 60532 Blue Peter
LNER A2 Peppercorn 60532 Blue Peter
Individual locomotives of Great Britain